Anna Sophia van Schönborn (around 1696 - November 5, 1760) was a Countess of Hoensbroek.

Anna Catharina Sophia was countess of Schönborn when she married Marquess Frans Arnold Adriaan Joannes Philip van Hoensbroek on November 3, 1720.

Frans Arnold, who met her in Metz in May 1718, was immediately in love with her, because of her charm. After they got married they lived in Hoensbroek Castle and later at Kasteel Hillenraad (Swalmen) and Kasteel Bleijenbeek (Bergen).

According to Egidius Slanghen she had a 24th child (twins) and also a couple of miscarriages. The countess, supposedly, died, mourning for the loss of her children, after a long period of illness in Kasteel Hoensbroek, and was buried in the main church of Hoensbroek November 7, 1760.

She is nicknamed the blauwe dame (blue Lady) after a portrait hanging in the main room of the castle.

See also 
List of rulers of Schönborn

Sources
www.heerlen.nl

1696 births
1760 deaths
History of Limburg (Netherlands)
People from Heerlen
Anna Sophia